Subliminal Criminals is the seventh studio album by the American rap metal band Stray from the Path. The album was released on August 14, 2015, by Sumerian Records and distributed by UNFD in Australia and New Zealand.

Lyrical themes
The guitarist Tom Williams said that the track "Outbreak" is about "the health industry and how illness is a business. Every year there is a new disease to be afraid of, more money to be made off of cancer treatments, and more prescriptions written." Williams elaborated on the album's lyrical themes further in an interview with MusicFeeds.au, saying that the lyrics "are very sardonic and very sarcastic." According to Williams, "Badge & a Bullet Part II" is about "people making arguments in which they lie to themselves and try to convince themselves that deaths related to police brutality aren’t linked to race. “Don’t call it a race issue!” People need to understand that there is a huge breakdown between minorities and police." The song "D.I.E.P.I.G." attacks musicians who use their fame to abuse underage fans, including Ian Watkins of Lostprophets and the singer-songwriter Front Porch Step, both of whom were directly referred to in the lyrics.

Track listing

Reception
In a review of the album, Brenton Harris of Music Feeds wrote, "As with previous recent releases from the band Subliminal Criminals wears both its hardcore and RATM influences on its sleeve, but on the whole the record doesn't sound like a retread of either sound, being too heavy to be branded a RATM knockoff and too varied to be dismissed as generic hardcore. ... Eight albums in, the revolution is upon us, and its impact will be far from subliminal."
The album was included at number 17 on Rock Sounds top 50 releases of 2015 list.

Personnel
 Andrew Dijorio – vocals
 Tom Williams – guitars
 Anthony Altamura – bass guitar, vocals
 Dan Bourke – drums

Charts

References

Bibliography
 

2015 albums
Stray from the Path albums
Sumerian Records albums
UNFD albums
Albums produced by Will Putney